Valerie Esang Whipps (née Remengesau) is a Palauan stateswoman who has been First Lady of Palau since 21 January 2021.

Career 
Whipps accompanied her husband on a state visit to Taiwan in March 2021. They met with President of Taiwan Tsai Ing-wen.

Family 
She married future President Surangel Whipps Jr. in 1999.

She is the daughter and sister of former presidents Thomas Remengesau Sr. and Tommy Remengesau Jr. respectively.

References 

Living people
Year of birth missing (living people)
Place of birth missing (living people)
21st-century Palauan women
Palauan women in politics
First Ladies of Palau
Daughters of national leaders